Popular is the third station on line K of the Metrocable. It is located in the northeast corner of Medellín, in a community known as Popular.

References

External links
 Official site of Medellín Metro 

Medellín Metro stations